Leopold Hoffer (1842 in Hungary – 28 August 1913 in England) was an English chess player and journalist.

He left Budapest for Switzerland. From 1867, he lived in Paris, where he won matches against, among others, Ignatz von Kolisch, Samuel Rosenthal and Jules Arnous de Rivière. In 1870, Hoffer emigrated to England, where he spent the remainder of his life.

From 1879-1896, Hoffer was a founder and editor (with Johannes Zukertort) of the magazine Chess Monthly.

Publications

References

External links

1842 births
1913 deaths
Hungarian Jews
Hungarian chess players
English chess players
Jewish chess players
British chess writers
British magazine editors
British Jews
19th-century chess players